Glabridin is a chemical compound that is found in the root extract of licorice (Glycyrrhiza glabra). Glabridin is an isoflavane, a type of isoflavonoid. This product is part of a larger family of plant-derived molecules, the natural phenols. Glabridin effectively inhibits platelet activation, so it might become therapeutic agent for thromboembolic disorders.

It is used as an ingredient in cosmetics and is listed in International Nomenclature of Cosmetic Ingredients (INCI).

Glabridin is yellowish-brown powder. It is insoluble in water, but soluble in organic solvents such as propylene glycol.

See also
 Glabrene
 Isoliquiritigenin
 Liquiritigenin

References

Isoflavanes